The Dung Gate ( Sha'ar Ha'ashpot), also known in Arabic as the Silwan Gate and Mughrabi Gate ( Bab al-Maghariba), is one of the Gates of the Old City of Jerusalem. It was built as a small postern gate in the 16th century by the Ottomans, first widened for vehicular traffic in 1952 by the Jordanians, and again in 1985 by the Israeli authorities.

The gate is situated near the southeast corner of the Old City, southwest of the Temple Mount.

Directly behind the gate lies the entrance to the Western Wall Plaza. The Dung Gate is a main passage for vehicles coming out of the Old City and for buses headed to the Western Wall.

Names
Built by the Ottomans in the 16th century, this small gate was then called Mughrabi Gate. In the 19th century, it started being called Dung Gate by Jews. It is also known as the Silwan Gate.

The original ''Dung Gate'' ( Sha'ar Ha'ashpot) was, in the Hebrew Bible (the name of a gate in the Jerusalem wall which was near the Pool of Siloam in the days of the Second Temple. It was probably named after the residue that was taken from the Jewish Temple into the Valley of Hinnom, where it was burned. The name was transferred to this small gate - at first, a small rectangular postern in the tower of the wall - in the 19th century.

Arabs refer to the gate as "the Mughrabi Gate", but that name is ambiguous as it also applies to one of the gates that allow entrance into the Temple Mount, inside the Old City walls. The name alludes to the Mughrabi Quarter, a neighborhood of North African Kutama Fatimids which was situated between both gates until 1967.

Finally, the name Silwan Gate refers to the village of Silwan, that lies outside the gate, broadly southeast of it.

History

Fortified Ottoman postern
The Dung Gate was built as part of the new city walls erected under Suleiman the Magnificent between 1537 and 1541. The original gate was just 1.5 metres wide, topped by an arch and only designed for pedestrians and pack animals to pass through. Initially the gate, or more precisely the postern, included an inner gate tower, which was demolished before the end of the Ottoman period. Towards the end of Ottoman rule, a new gate tower or gatehouse was added, but this time outside the wall, in a style that blended in with the 16th-century fortifications. This outer tower was demolished by the British Mandate officials in 1938, probably as part of their drive to restore the walls to their original look, this bringing back to light the old stone decorations.

Jordanian and Israeli modernisation
In 1952, when the gate was widened by the Jordanian authorities to allow cars and buses to pass through it, a reinforced concrete girder was installed under the old stone arch. In 1984-85 the gate was again enlarged, the old arch and the other decorative elements being raised, so that the opening reached a height of 4.5 metres. The modern gate is built of reinforced concrete, but clad in stone, and the new design helps the old and new elements blend together without disturbing the general style of the city wall, with the gate's opening closing in a more curvy line instead of the straight Jordanian lintel. Landscape architect Shlomo Aronson cooperated with architect Arthur Kutcher at implementing the decision of the Jerusalem Foundation established by then-mayor Teddy Kollek, motivated by the sharp increase in pilgrims traffic.

See also
Gates of the Old City of Jerusalem
Walls of Jerusalem

References

External links
Bab al-Maghariba
 Pictures of the Dung Gate
 Moors site

Gates in Jerusalem's Old City Walls
Western Wall
Ezra–Nehemiah